Unexploded ordnance (UXO, sometimes abbreviated as UO), unexploded bombs (UXBs), and explosive remnants of war (ERW or ERoW) are explosive weapons (bombs, shells, grenades, land mines, naval mines, cluster munition, and other munitions) that did not explode when they were employed and still pose a risk of detonation, sometimes many decades after they were used or discarded. UXO does not always originate from wars; areas such as military training grounds can also hold significant numbers, even after the area has been abandoned. UXO from World War I continue to be a hazard, with poisonous gas filled munitions still a problem. When unwanted munitions are found, they are sometimes destroyed in controlled explosions, but accidental detonation of even very old explosives also occurs, sometimes with fatal results.

Seventy-eight countries are contaminated by land mines, which kill or maim 15,000–20,000 people every year. Approximately 80% of casualties are civilian, with children the most affected age group. An estimated average of 50% of deaths occurs within hours of the blast. In recent years, mines have been used increasingly as weapons of terror against local civilian populations, specifically.

In addition to the obvious danger of explosion, buried UXO can cause environmental contamination. In some heavily used military training areas, munitions-related chemicals such as explosives and perchlorate (a component of pyrotechnics and rocket fuel) can enter soil and groundwater.

Risks and problems

Unexploded ordnance, however old, may explode. Even if it does not explode, environmental pollutants are released as it degrades. Recovery, particularly of deeply-buried projectiles, is difficult and hazardous—jarring may detonate the charge. Once uncovered, explosives can often be transported safely to a site where they can be destroyed, failing that, they must be detonated in place—sometimes requiring hundreds of homes to be evacuated.

Unexploded ordnance from at least as far back as the mid-19th century still poses a hazard worldwide, both in current and former combat areas and on military firing ranges. A major problem with unexploded ordnance is that over the years the detonator and main charge deteriorate, frequently making them more sensitive to disturbance, and therefore more dangerous to handle. Construction work may disturb unsuspected unexploded bombs, which may then explode. Forest fires may be aggravated if buried ordnance explodes and heat waves, causing the water level to drop severely, may increase the danger of immersed ordnance. There are countless examples of people tampering with unexploded ordnance that is many years old, often with fatal results. For this reason it is universally recommended that unexploded ordnance should not be touched or handled by unqualified persons. Instead, the location should be reported to the local police so that bomb disposal or Explosive Ordnance Disposal (EOD) professionals can render it safe.

German EOD experts were notified and attended the scene. Whilst residents living nearby were being evacuated and the EOD personnel were preparing to disarm the bomb, it detonated, killing three of them and severely injuring six others. The dead and injured each had over 20 years of hands-on experience, and had previously rendered safe between 600 and 700 unexploded bombs. The bomb which killed and injured the EOD personnel was of a particularly dangerous type because it was fitted with a delayed-action chemical fuze (with an integral anti-handling device) which had not operated as designed, but had become highly unstable after over 65 years underground. The type of delayed-action fuze in the Göttingen bomb was commonly used: a glass vial containing acetone was smashed after the bomb was released; the acetone was intended, as it dripped downwards, to disintegrate celluloid discs holding back a spring-loaded trigger that would strike a detonator when the discs degraded sufficiently after some minutes or hours. These bombs, when striking soft earth at an angle, often ended their trajectory not pointing downwards, so that the acetone did not drip onto and weaken the celluloid; but over many years the discs degraded until the trigger was released and the bomb detonated spontaneously, or when weakened by being jarred.

In November 2013 four US Marines were killed by an explosion whilst clearing unexploded ordnance from a firing range at Camp Pendleton. The exact cause is not known, but the Marines had been handing grenades they were collecting to each other, which is permitted but discouraged, and it is thought that a grenade may have exploded after being kicked or bumped, setting off hundreds of other grenades and shells.

When the deeper World War II wreck of the SS Kielce, carrying a much smaller load of explosives, exploded in 1967, it produced an earth tremor measuring 4.5 on the Richter scale.

Around the world

Africa

North Africa, and in particular the desert areas of the Sahara, is heavily mined and with serious consequences for the local population. Egypt is the most heavily mined country in the world (by number) with as many as 19.7 million mines as of 2000.

Land mines and other explosive remnants of war are not limited to North Africa, however; they pose a persistent threat to local people all over the continent, including the countries of Ethiopia, Somalia, Nigeria, Senegal, Angola, Kenya, Uganda and South Africa to mention just a few. In the Tropics, typhoons and floods often displace and spread landmines, further aggravating the problem. In Mozambique, as much as 70% of the country is now contaminated with mines because of this.

Americas

Colombia
During the long Colombian conflict that began around 1964, a very large number of landmines were deployed in rural areas across Colombia. The landmines are homemade and were placed primarily during the last 25 years of the conflict, hindering rural development significantly. The rebel groups of FARC and the smaller ELN are usually blamed for having placed the mines. All departments of Colombia are affected, but Antioquia, where the city of Medellin is located, holds the largest amounts. After Afghanistan, Colombia has the second-highest number of landmine casualties, with more than 11,500 people killed or injured by landmines since 1990, according to Colombian government figures.

In September 2012, the Colombian peace process began officially in Havana and in August 2016, the US and Norway initiated an international five-year demining program, now supported by another 24 countries and the EU. Both the Colombian military and FARC are taking part in the demining efforts. The program intends to rid Colombia of landmines and other UXO by 2021 and it has been funded with nearly US$112 million, including US$33 million from the US (as part of the larger US foreign policy Plan Colombia) and US$20 million from Norway. Experts however, have estimated that it will take at least a decade due to the difficult terrain.

United States
While, unlike many countries in Europe and Asia, the United States has not been subjected to aerial bombardment, according to the Department of Defense, "millions of acres" may contain UXO, Discarded Military Munitions (DMM) and Munitions Constituents (e.g., explosive compounds).

According to US Environmental Protection Agency documents released in late 2002, UXO at 16,000 domestic inactive military ranges within the United States pose an "imminent and substantial" public health risk and could require the largest environmental cleanup ever, at a cost of at least US$14 billion. Some individual ranges cover , and, taken together, the ranges comprise an area the size of Florida.

On Joint Base Cape Cod (JBCC) on Cape Cod, Massachusetts, decades of artillery training have contaminated the only drinking water for thousands of surrounding residents. A costly UXO recovery effort is under way.

UXO on US military bases has caused problems for transferring and restoring Base Realignment and Closure (BRAC) land. The Environmental Protection Agency's efforts to commercialize former munitions testing grounds are complicated by UXO, making investments and development risky.

The area around Fort St. Philip Louisiana is also covered in UXO from the naval bombardment, and caution would be taken when visiting the ruins.

Estimated cleanup costs are tens of billions of dollars. It costs roughly $1,000 to demolish a UXO on site. Other costs include surveying and mapping, removing vegetation from the site, transportation, and personnel to manually detect UXOs with metal detectors. Searching for UXOs is tedious work and often 100 holes are dug to every 1 UXO found. Other methods of finding UXOs include digital geophysics detection with land and airborne systems.

Examples
In December 2007, UXO was discovered in new development areas outside Orlando, Florida, and construction had to be halted. Other areas nearby are also affected; for example boaters avoid the Indian River Lagoon, which contains UXO thought to be left from live bombing runs performed during World War II by pilots from nearby DeLand Naval Air Station.

Plum Tree Island National Wildlife Refuge in Poquoson, Virginia, was heavily used as a bombing range by pilots from nearby Langley Air Force Base from 1917 through the 1950s. The  former bombing range was transferred to the US Fish and Wildlife Service in 1972. Air Force records show that  of various-sized bombs were dropped in just one exercise in December 1938. Because the area is alternately marshy or sandy, many of the bombs did not explode, and were partly or completely buried in mud and sand or lie in the surf just offshore. In 1958, three teenage boys who landed their boat on the island were seriously injured when a  practice bomb exploded. As of 2007, the US military had not removed a single bomb from the island, which is adjacent to the Poquoson Flats, a popular destination for fishermen and recreational boaters. Signs placed offshore to warn the public of the hidden danger posed by buried UXO have not been consistently replaced after being blown down by storms. According to the US Army Corps of Engineers (USACE), the cleanup of the UXO on the island could take years and cost tens of millions of dollars.

In 1917, in response to other nations' extensive use of chemical weapons in World War I, the US Army Chemical Warfare Service (CWS) opened a weapons research laboratory and production facility at American University in Washington, D.C. CWS troops at the station routinely fired incendiary and chemical projectiles into a nearby undeveloped area that became known as "No Man's Land". When the station was deactivated after the war in 1919, UXO in No Man's Land was abandoned there, and unused projectiles and toxic chemicals were buried in deep, poorly mapped pits. Collegiate athletic fields, businesses and homes were subsequently built in the area. Chemical UXO continues to be periodically found on and near campus, and in 2001, the USACE began cleanup efforts after arsenic was found in soil at the athletic fields. In 2017, the USACE was cautiously excavating a university-owned property in an adjacent neighborhood where investigators believed that a large unmapped cache of mustard gas projectiles was buried.

Although comparatively rare, unexploded ordnance from the American Civil War is still occasionally found and is still deadly over 150 years later. Union and Confederate troops fired an estimated 1.5 million artillery shells at each other from 1861 to 1865. As many as one in five did not explode. In 1973, during the restoration of Weston Manor, an 18th-century plantation house in Hopewell, Virginia, that was shelled by Union gunboats during the Civil War, a live shell was found embedded in the dining room ceiling. The ball was disarmed and is shown to visitors to the plantation. The shell was taken to the city landfill where it was safely detonated by ordnance disposal experts.

According to Alaska State Troopers, an unexploded aerial bomb, found at a home off Warner Road, was safely detonated by Fort Wainwright soldiers on September 19, 2019.

Canada 
After WWII, much unused ordnance in Canada  was dumped along the country's eastern and western coasts at sites selected by the Canadian military. Other UXO in Canada is found on sites used by the Canadian military for operations, training and weapons tests. These sites are labeled under the "legacy sites" program created in 2005 to identify areas and quantify risk due to UXO. As of 2019, the Department of National Defence has confirmed 62 locations as legacy sites, with a further 774 sites in assessment. There has been controversy because some lands appropriated by the military during WWII were owned by First Nations, such as  that make up Camp Ipperwash in Ontario, which was given with the understanding that the land would be given back at the end of the war. These lands have required and still need extensive clean-up efforts due to the possible presence of UXO.

Asia

Japan
Thousands of tons of UXOs remain buried across Japan, particularly in Okinawa, where over 200,000 tons of ordnance were dropped during the final year of the Second World War. From 1945 until the end of the U.S. occupation of the island in 1972, the Japan Self-Defense Forces (JSDF) and the US military disposed of 5,500 tons of UXO. Over 30,000 UXO disposal operations have been conducted on Okinawa by the JSDF since 1972, and it is estimated it could take close to a century to dispose of the remaining UXOs on the islands. No injuries or deaths have been reported as a result of UXO disposal, however. Tokyo and other major cities, including Kobe, Yokohama and Fukuoka, were targeted by several massive air raids during the Second World War, which left behind numerous UXOs. Shells from Imperial Army and Navy guns also continue to be discovered.

On 29 October 2012, an unexploded  US bomb with a functioning detonator was discovered near a runway at Sendai Airport during reconstruction following the 2011 Tōhoku earthquake and tsunami, resulting in the airport being closed and all flights cancelled. The airport reopened the next day after the bomb was safely contained, but closed again on 14 November while the bomb was defused and safely removed.

The shell was detonated in place by a JGSDF UXO disposal squad in June, causing 150 scheduled rail and Shinkansen services to be halted for three hours and affecting 90,000 commuters. In July, an unexploded  US bomb from an air raid was discovered near the Akabane Station in the Kita Ward and defused on site by the JGSDF in November, resulting in the evacuation of 3,000 households nearby and causing several trains to be halted for an hour while the UXO was being defused.

On 13 April 2014, the JGSDF defused an unexploded  US oil incendiary bomb discovered at a construction site in Kurume, Fukuoka Prefecture, which required the evacuation of 740 people living nearby.

On 16 March 2015, a  bomb was found in central Osaka.

In December 2019, 100 buildings were evacuated to remove a  WWII bomb found on Okinawa's Camp Kinser.

South Asia

Afghanistan
According to The Guardian, since 2001, the coalition forces dropped about 20,000 tonnes of ammunition over Afghanistan with an estimated 10% of munitions not detonated according to some experts. Many valleys, fields and dry riverbeds in Macca have been used by foreign soldiers as firing ranges, leaving them peppered with undetonated ammunition. Despite the removal of 16.5m items since mine-clearing programmes were established in 1989 after the Soviet withdrawal, Macca and its predecessors have recorded 22,000 casualties in the same period.

Sri Lanka

Southeast Asia
Most countries of Southeast Asia – and all countries of Indochina specifically – are contaminated with unexploded ordnance. Most of the UXOs of today are remnants from the Vietnam War which, apart from Vietnam, also included neighbouring Cambodia and Laos, but other conflicts and civil wars have also contributed.

Cambodia

Laos

Laos is considered the world's most heavily bombed nation per capita. During the period of the Vietnam War, over half a million American bombing missions dropped more than 2 million tons of ordnance on Laos, most of it anti-personnel cluster bombs. Each cluster bomb shell contained hundreds of individual bomblets, "bombies", about the size of a tennis ball. An estimated 30% of these munitions did not detonate. Ten of the 18 Laotian provinces have been described as "severely contaminated" with artillery and mortar shells, mines, rockets, grenades, and other devices from various countries of origin. These munitions pose a continuing obstacle to agriculture and a special threat to children, who are attracted by the toylike devices.

Some 288 million cluster munitions and about 75 million unexploded bombs were left across Laos after the war ended.  From 1996 to 2009, more than 1 million items of UXO were destroyed, freeing up 23,000 hectares of land. Between 1999 and 2008, there were 2,184 casualties (including 834 deaths) from UXO incidents.

Myanmar

Vietnam
In Vietnam, 800,000 tons of landmines and unexploded ordnance is buried in the land and mountains. From 1975 to 2015, up to 100,000 people have been injured or killed by bombs left over from the second Indochina war.

At present, all 63 provinces and cities are contaminated with UXO and landmines. However, it is possible to prioritize demining for the Northern border provinces of Lang Son, Ha Giang and the six Central provinces of Nghe An, Ha Tinh, Quang Binh, Quang Tri, Thua Thien and Quang Ngai. Particularly in these 6 central provinces, up to 2010, there were 22,760 victims of landmines and UXO, of which 10,529 died and 12,231 were injured.

"The National Action Plan for the Prevention and Fighting of Unexploded Ordnance and Mines from 2010 to 2025" has been prepared and promulgated by the Vietnamese Government in April 2010.

Western Asia

Western Asia, including the Middle East and border states towards Russia, is severely affected by UXO, in particular land mines. Not only are civilians killed and maimed regularly, it also impedes economic growth and development by restricting the use of natural resources and farmland.

Iraq

Iraq is widely contaminated with unexploded remnants of war from the Iran–Iraq War (1980–1988), the Gulf War (1990–1991), the Iraq War (2003–2011) and the Iraqi Civil War (2014–2017). The UXO in Iraq poses a particularly serious threat to civilians as millions of cluster bomb munitions were dropped in towns and densely populated areas by Coalition forces, mostly in the first few weeks of the 2003 invasion of Iraq. An estimated 30% of the munitions failed to detonate on impact and small unexploded bombs are regularly found in and around homes in Iraq, frequently maiming or killing civilians and restricting land use. From 1991 to 2009, an estimated 8,000 people were killed or maimed by cluster bomblets alone, 2,000 of which were children. Land mines are another part of the UXO problem in Iraq as they litter large areas of farmland and many oil fields, severely affecting economic recovery and development.

Reporting and monitoring is lacking in Iraq and no completely reliable survey and overview of the local threat levels exists. Useful statistics on injuries and deaths caused by UXO is also missing, only singular local reports exist. UNDP and UNICEF however, issued a partial survey report in 2009, concluding that the entire country is contaminated and more than 1.6 million Iraqis are affected by UXO. More than 1,730 km2 (670 square miles) in total are saturated with unexploded ordnance (including land mines). The south-east region and Baghdad are the most heavily contaminated areas and UNDP has designated around 4,000 communities as "hazard areas".

Kuwait
The Government has launched the Kuwait Environmental Remediation Project, a set of deals of the scale of US$2.9 billion to promote, among other initiates, the clearance of unexploded ordnance remaining from the First Gulf War.

Regarding specifically the removal of bombs, it is estimated to have a budget in the region of US$20 million.

The companies that have been prequalified as KOC has announced are:
 Azerbaijan National Agency For Mine Action (ANAMA, Azerbaijan)
 EOD Technology (US)
 Expal Systems (Spain)
 Explomo Technical Services (Singapore)
 G4S Risk Management (UK)
 Horizon Assignments (India)
 Maritime & Underwater Security Contractors (UAE)
 Mechem (South Africa)
 Mine / Eodclr (Canada)
 Minetech International (UK)
 Notra (Canada)
 Olive Mine Action (British Virgin Islands)
 Relyant (US)
 RPS Energy (UK)
 Sarvatra Technical Consultants (India)

According to an industry source, KOC is expected to issue another tender later this month. This will request bids on a contract that will include taking 30,000 samples from oil lakes in Kuwait in order to better understand the nature of the pollution in the country's oil-contaminated deserts.

There are numerous mines, bombs and other explosives left from the Persian Gulf war, which makes a simple U-turn on a dirt road a life-threatening maneuver, unless performed entirely in an area covered by fresh tire tracks. Risking walking or driving in unknown areas puts oneself in danger of detonating those forgotten explosives.

In Kuwait City, there are some signs that warn people to keep distance from the broad and gleaming beaches, for example. Although, even the experts still have trouble. According to a New York Times article: Several Saudi soldiers involved in mine clearing have been killed or wounded. Two were hurt while demonstrating mine clearing for reporters.

Weeks right after the Gulf, hospitals in Kuwait reported that mines did not appear to be a major cause of injury. Six weeks after the Iraqi retreat, at Ahmadi Hospital, in an area thick with cluster bombs and Iraqi mines, the only injury was a hospital employee who had picked up an anti-personnel bomb as a souvenir.

Lebanon
In the aftermath of the 2006 war between Israel and Lebanon, it is estimated that southern Lebanon is littered with one million undetonated cluster bombs – approximately 1.5 bombs per Lebanese inhabitant of the region, dropped by Israeli Defense Forces in the last days of the war.

Yemen

Europe

Despite massive demining efforts, Europe is still affected to some extent by UXO from mainly World War I and World War II, some countries more than others. However, newer and present military conflicts are also affecting some areas severely, in particular the countries of former Yugoslavia in western Balkans and Ukraine.

Austria
WWII's unexploded ordnance in Austria is blown up twice a year in the military training area near Allentsteig. Moreover, explosives are still being recovered from lakes, rivers and mountains dating back to WWI on the frontier between Austria and Italy.

Balkans

As a result of the Yugoslav Wars (1991–2001), the countries of Albania, Bosnia-Herzegovina, Croatia and Kosovo have all been negatively affected by UXOs, mostly land mines in hilly and mountainous regions. Due to the lack of awareness of these post-war landmines, civilian casualties have risen since the end of the wars. Many efforts made by peacekeeping forces in Bosnia such as IFOR, SFOR (and its successor EUFOR ALTHEA), and in Kosovo with KFOR in order to contain these landmines have been met with some difficulty. Despite this, some areas have been completely cleared.

The Federal Civil Protection Administration (FUCZ) team deactivated and destroyed four WWII bombs found at a construction site in the centre of Sarajevo in September 2019.

France and Belgium

In the Ardennes region of France, large-scale citizen evacuations were necessary during MEC removal operations in 2001. In the forests of Verdun French government "démineurs" working for the Département du Déminage still hunt for poisonous, volatile, and/or explosive munitions and recover about 900 tons every year. The most feared are corroded artillery shells containing chemical warfare agents such as mustard gas. French and Flemish farmers still find many UXOs when ploughing their fields, the so-called "iron harvest".

In Belgium, Dovo, the country's bomb disposal unit, recovers between 150 and 200 tons of unexploded bombs each year.  Over 20 members of the unit have been killed since it was formed in 1919.

In February 2019, a  bomb was found at a construction site at Porte de la Chapelle, near the Gare du Nord in Paris. The bomb, which led to a temporary cancellation of Eurostar trains to Paris and evacuation of 2,000 people, was probably dropped by RAF in April 1944, targeting the Nazi-occupied Paris before the D-Day landings in Normandy.

Germany

In Germany, the responsibility for UXO disposal falls to the states, each of which operates a bomb disposal unit. Germany's bomb squads are considered some of the busiest worldwide, deactivating a bomb every two weeks.

An estimated 5,500 UXOs from the Second World War are still uncovered each year in Germany, an average of 15 per day. Concentration is especially high in Berlin, where many artillery shells and smaller munitions from the Battle of Berlin are uncovered each year. While most cases only make local news, one of the more spectacular finds in recent history was an American  aerial bomb discovered in Munich on 28 August 2012. As it was deemed too unsafe for transport, it had to be exploded on site, shattering windows over a wide area of Schwabing and causing structural damage to several homes despite precautions to minimize damage.

One of the largest individual pieces ever found was an unexploded 'Tallboy' bomb uncovered in the Sorpe Dam in 1958.
In 2011, a 1.8-tonne RAF bomb from the Second World War was uncovered in Koblenz on the bottom of the Rhine River after a prolonged drought. It caused the evacuation of 45,000 people from the city. In May 2015, some 20,000 people had to leave their homes in Cologne in order to be safe while a one-tonne bomb was defused.

On December 20, 2016 another 1.8-tonne RAF bomb was found in the city centre of Augsburg and prompted the evacuation of 54,000 people on December 25, which was considered the biggest bomb-related evacuation in Germany's post-war history at the time. In May 2017, 50,000 people in Hanover had to be evacuated in order to defuse three British unexploded bombs.

On 29 August 2017, a British HC 4000 bomb was discovered during construction work near the Goethe University in Frankfurt, requiring the evacuation of approximately 70,000 people within a radius of 1.5 km. This was the largest evacuation in Germany since the Second World War. Later, it was successfully defused on 3 September.

On 8 April 2018, a 1.8-tonne bomb was defused in Paderborn, which caused the evacuation of more than 26,000 people. On 24 May 2018, a  bomb was defused in Dresden after the initial attempts of deactivation failed, and caused a small explosion. On 3 July 2018, a  bomb was disabled in Potsdam which caused 10,000 people to be evacuated from the region. In August 2018, 18,500 people in the city of Ludwigshafen had to be evacuated, in order to detonate a  bomb dropped by American forces.

In Summer 2018, high temperatures caused a decrease in the water level of the Elbe River in which grenades, mines and other explosives founded in the eastern German states of Saxony-Anhalt and Saxony were dumped. In November 2018, 10,000 people had to be evacuated, in order to defuse an American unexploded bomb found in Cologne. In December 2018, a  WWII bomb was discovered in Mönchengladbach.

On 31 January 2019, a WWII bomb was detonated in Lingen, Lower Saxony, which caused property damage of shattering windows and the evacuation of 9,000 people. In February 2019, an American unexploded bomb was found in Essen, which led to the evacuation of 4,000 residents within a radius of 250 to 500 metres of defusing work. A few weeks later, a  bomb led to the evacuation of 8,000 people in Nuremberg. In March 2019, another  bomb was found in Rostock. In April 2019, a WWII bomb was found near the U.S. military facilities in Wiesbaden.

On 14 April 2019, 600 people were evacuated when a bomb was discovered in Frankfurt's River Main. Divers with the city's fire service were participating in a routine training exercise when they found the  device. Later in April, thousands were evacuated in both Regensburg and Cologne, upon the discovery of unexploded ordnance.

On 23 June 2019, a WWII aerial bomb that was buried 4 metres underground in a field in Limburg self-detonated and left a crater that measured 10 metres wide and 4 metres deep. Though no one was injured, the explosion was powerful enough to register a minor tremor of 1.7 on the Richter scale. In June 2019, a World War II bomb, weighing , was found near the European Central Bank in Frankfurt am Main. More than 16,000 people were told to evacuate the location before the bomb was defused by the ordnance authorities on July 7, 2019.

On September 2, 2019, over 15,000 people were evacuated in Hanover, after a World War II aerial bomb, weighing , was found at a construction site.

On October 29, 2021, a five-year-old boy discovered a British hand grenade from World War II on the playground of his kindergarten "An der Beverbäke" in Oldenburg. He took it home in his backpack. The kindergarten is located on a former barracks site used by the Bundeswehr until 2007, which was converted into a residential area.

On December 1, 2021, an old aircraft bomb exploded in the city of Munich during construction near Donnersbergerbruecke station.

Malta
Malta, then a British colony, was heavily bombarded by Italian and German aircraft during WWII. During the war the Royal Engineers had a Bomb Disposal Section which cleared about 7300 unexploded bombs between 1940 and 1942. UXO is still being found intermittently in Malta as of the early 21st century, and the Explosive Ordnance Disposal unit of the Armed Forces of Malta (AFM) is responsible for removing such ordnance. In July 2021, a Hedgehog anti-submarine mortar which likely fell off a British warship during the war was discovered on a beach in Marsaxlokk and it was successfully removed by the AFM.

Poland
In October 2020, Polish Navy divers discovered a six-ton "Tallboy" British bomb. During the attempt to remotely neutralise the bomb, it exploded in a shipping canal off the Polish port city of Świnoujscie. The Polish Navy considered it a success because the divers were able to ultimately destroy the munition with zero casualties reported.
The government reportedly took all necessary measures before they started to defuse the bomb, which included evacuating 750 residents from the site.

Spain
Since the 1980s, more than 750,000 pieces of UXO from the Spanish Civil War (1936–1939) has been recovered and destroyed by the Guardia Civil in Spain. In the 2010s, around 1,000 bombs, artillery shells and grenades have been defused every year.

Ukraine
Ukraine is contaminated with UXO from World War II, former Soviet military training and the current Russo-Ukrainian War. Most of the UXO from the World Wars has presumably been removed by demining efforts in the mid 1970s, but sporadic remnants may remain in unknown locations. The UXO from the recent military conflicts includes both landmines and cluster bomblets dropped and set by both Ukrainian, anti-government and Russian forces. Reports of booby traps harming civilians also exist. Ukraine reports that Donetsk and Luhansk Oblast are the regions mostly affected by unexploded submunitions. Proper, reliable statistics are currently unavailable, and information from the involved combatants are possibly politically biased and partly speculative. However, 600 deaths and 2,000 injured due to UXO in 2014 and 2015 alone have been accounted for.

United Kingdom

UXO is standard terminology in the United Kingdom, although in artillery, especially on practice ranges, an unexploded shell is referred to as a blind, and during the Blitz in World War II an unexploded bomb was referred to as a UXB.

Most current UXO risk is limited to areas in cities, mainly London, Sheffield and Portsmouth, that were heavily bombed during the Blitz, and to land used by the military to store ammunition and for training. According to the Construction Industry Research and Information Association (CIRIA), from 2006 to 2009 over 15,000 items of ordnance were found in construction sites in the UK. It is not uncommon for many homes to be evacuated temporarily when a bomb is found. 1,000 residents were evacuated in Plymouth in April 2007 when a Second World War bomb was discovered, and in June 2008 a  bomb was found in Bow in East London. In 2009 CIRIA published Unexploded Ordnance (UXO) – a guide for the construction industry to provide advice on assessing the risk posed by UXO.

The burden of Explosive Ordnance Disposal in the UK is split between Royal Engineers Bomb Disposal Officers, Royal Logistic Corps Ammunition Technicians in the Army, Clearance Divers of the Royal Navy and the Armourers of the Royal Air Force. The Metropolitan Police of London is the only force not to rely on the Ministry of Defence, although they generally focus on contemporary terrorist devices rather than unexploded ordnance and will often call military teams in to deal with larger and historical bombs.

In May 2016, a  bomb was found at the former Royal High Junior School in Bath which led to 1,000 houses being evacuated. In September 2016, a  bomb was discovered on the seabed in Portsmouth Harbour. In March 2017, a  bomb was found in Brondesbury Park, London. In May 2017, a  device was detonated in Birmingham. In February 2018, a  bomb was discovered in the Thames which forced London City Airport to cancel all the scheduled flights. In February 2019, a  explosive device was located and destroyed in Dovercourt, near Harwich, Essex.

On September 26, 2019, Invicta Valley Primary School in Kings Hill was reportedly evacuated after an unexploded WW2 bomb was discovered in its vicinity.

In February 2021, thousands of residents of Exeter were evacuated from their homes prior to the detonation of a 1000 kg WWII bomb; the ensuing blast blew out windows and caused structural damage to nearby homes, leaving some uninhabitable.

Pacific

Buried and abandoned aerial and mortar bombs, artillery shells, and other unexploded ordnance from World War II have threatened communities across the islands of the South Pacific.  the Office of Weapons Removal and Abatement in the U.S. Department of State's Bureau of Political-Military Affairs invested more than $5.6 million in support of conventional weapons destruction programs in the Pacific Islands.

On the battlefield of Peleliu Island in the Republic of Palau UXO removal made the island safe for tourism.
At Hell's Point Guadalcanal Province in the Solomon Islands an explosive ordnance disposal training program was established which safely disposed of hundreds of items of UXO. It trained police personnel to respond to EOD call-outs in the island's highly populated areas.
On Mili Atoll and Maloelap Atoll in the Marshall Islands removal of UXO has allowed for population expansion into formerly inaccessible areas.

In the Marianas, World War II-era unexploded ordnance is still often found and detonated under controlled conditions.

In September 2020, two Norwegian People's Aid employees were killed in an explosion in a residential area of Honiara, Solomon Islands, while clearing unexploded ordnance left over from the Pacific War of World War II.

In international law

Protocol V of the Convention on Certain Conventional Weapons requires that when active hostilities have ended the parties must clear the areas under their control from "explosive remnants of war". Land mines are covered similarly by Protocol II.

Detection technology

Many weapons, including aerial bombs in particular, are discovered during construction work, after lying undetected for decades. Having failed to explode while resting undiscovered is no guarantee that a bomb will not explode when disturbed. Such discoveries are common in heavily bombed cities, without a serious enough threat to warrant systematic searching.

Where there is known to be much unexploded ordnance, in cases of unexploded subsoil ordnance a remote investigation is done by visual interpretation of available historical aerial photographs. Modern techniques can combine geophysical and survey methods with modern electromagnetic and magnetic detectors.  This provides digital mapping of UXO contamination with the aim to better target subsequent excavations, reducing the cost of digging on every metallic contact and speeding the clearance process. Magnetometer probes can detect UXO and provide geotechnical data before drilling or piling is carried out.

In the U.S., the Strategic Environmental Research and Development Program (SERDP) and Environmental Security Technology Certification Program (ESTCP) Department of Defense programs fund research into the detection and discrimination of UXO from scrap metal. Much of the cost of UXO removal comes from removing non-explosive items that the metal detectors have identified, so improved discrimination is critical. New techniques such as shape reconstruction from magnetic data and better de-noising techniques will reduce cleanup costs and enhance recovery.
The Interstate Technology & Regulatory Council published a Geophysical Classification for Munitions Response guidance document in August 2015.
UXO or UXBs (as they are called in some countries – unexploded bombs) are broadly classified into buried and unburied. The disposal team carries out reconnaissance of the area and determines the location of the ordnance. If is not buried it may be dug up carefully and disposed of. But if the bomb is buried it becomes a huge task. A team is formed to find the location of the bomb using metal detectors and then the earth is dug carefully.

See also
 Ammunition dump
 Danger UXB, a 1979 British ITV television series set during the Second World War
 Delay-action bomb
 Dud
 Mines Advisory Group
 Ordnance
 Red Zone
 ZEUS-HLONS (HMMWV Laser Ordnance Neutralization System)

References

Further reading

External links

 Mines Advisory Group
 US Department of Defense UXO Awareness web site

Bombs
Cluster munition
Explosive weapons
Environmental impact of war
Articles containing video clips